Than Tun (6 April 1923 – 30 November 2005) was an influential Burmese historian as well as an outspoken critic of the military junta of Burma. For his lifelong contributions to the development of worldwide study of Burmese history and culture, Professor Than Tun was awarded the Fukuoka Asian Culture Prize in 2000.

Early life and education
A native of Daunggyi village, Ngathaingchaung / Yekyi Township, Irrawaddy Division, Than Tun entered Rangoon University in 1939, and received bachelor's degrees in history and law in 1946 and 1948, respectively and an MA in history in 1950. In 1956, he received his PhD in history with a paper named “Buddhism in Burma: (1000-1300)"  from  University of London, School of Oriental and African Studies (SOAS).

Academic career
Dr. Than Tun became a lecturer in University of Rangoon’s Department of History and Political Science in 1959. In 1965, he was promoted to the Professor and Head of Department in History at University of Mandalay. Professor Than Tun left Mandalay in 1982 for University of Kyoto’s Center for South East Asian Studies where he was a Research Fellow and Visiting Professor from 1982 to 1987. Later, he was a visiting professor in Northern Illinois University where he was awarded an Honorary Doctorate of Literature in 1988. From 1989 to 1990, he was a visiting scholar at the University of Michigan. In 1990 he came back to Burma and worked as a Member of the Myanmar (Burmese) Historical Commission and Emeritus Professor in University of Yangon in the Departments of History and Archeology.

In 2000 Fukuoka Asian Culture prize Committee awarded Professor Than Tun the highest worldwide academic award, a Literate of the 11th Fukuoka Asian Culture Prizes in the Academic Prize Category.

Professor Than Tun was a leading figure in the field of history and as the most prominent scholar of pre-modern history. Among his many significant publications, the most celebrated both at home and abroad are "History of Buddhism in Burma" and "The Medieval Myanmar History", both of which richly employ the epigraphs of the Bagan Dynasty from the 11th to the 13th centuries. These books are the fruit of hard work into which the professor put his heart and soul.

Another of his publications, The Royal Orders of Burma, comprises ten volumes and took him eight years to complete. In this study, he compared the existing copies of royal orders from the dynasty period and subjected them to rigorous analysis. This voluminous work of 7,600 pages includes an abridged English translation, commentaries, and index, and is the most reliable collection of original historical documents. This is such an outstanding achievement that it has become known as the 'Than Tun Text'. All his academic work, including theses and books, is more than just a clarification of Burmese history by a Burmese native—it places the country's history and culture into the wider context of world history, thus contributing greatly to the further development of the worldwide study of Burmese history.

Critic of the military junta 
Professor Than Tun was also known as a fearlessly outspoken critic of successive military juntas of Burma, and, for not toeing to the official line when it comes to the history of Burma. Than Tun often criticized the generals for attempting to rewrite the history of Burma according to the requirements of their propagandas, and his well-researched books on Burma, had often been banned by the authorities or sidelined by publishers for fear of punishments from the paranoid generals.

Professor Than Tun was very critical of the military junta’s defacing of the ancient Burmese capital the Old Bagan with unnecessary, garish and over-the-top ‘re-innovations’ of its ancient temples, the construction of a motorway among the ruins and the erection of an observation tower for the benefits of dollar yielding tourists. Often irreverent towards the country’s military leadership, he once commented in an interview with The Irrawaddy in 2003 on the generals’ obsession with white elephants as bringers of good fortune:

Death
On 30 November 2005, Than Tun died unexpectedly while traveling to a 90th birthday celebration in Mandalay for celebrated Burmese literary figure Ludu Daw Amar. The professor was buried in a cemetery on the outskirts of Amarapura, south of Mandalay, where some 300 people, many of them former students, gathered to mourn his death. He was survived by his wife Khin Yi, and daughter, Mizu Than Tun.

Legacy
The Ludu Library in Mandalay houses a complete collection of Than Tun's works.

Publications

References

External links 
DVB Than Tun obituary
Than Tun Biography

Dr. Than Tun's Last Interview with Radio Free Asia (Burmese) audio
The One and Only

1923 births
2005 deaths
University of Yangon alumni
Academic staff of the University of Yangon
20th-century Burmese historians
University of Michigan staff
People from Ayeyarwady Region
Burmese expatriates in the United States
Academic staff of Mandalay University
Academic staff of Kyoto University